The men's high jump event at the 1999 Summer Universiade was held at the Estadio Son Moix in Palma de Mallorca, Spain on 12 and 13 July.

Medalists

Results

Qualification
Qualification: 2.25 (Q) or at least 12 best performers (q) advance to the final

Final

References

Athletics at the 1999 Summer Universiade
1999